Bidorpitia banosana is a species of moth of the family Tortricidae. It is found in Tungurahua Province, Ecuador.

The wingspan is about 24 mm. The ground colour of the forewings is cinnamon with distinct refraction and numerous fine rust=brown strigulae (fine streaks). The markings are rust brown. The hindwings are ochreous cream, tinged with orange on the periphery.

Etymology
The species name refers to the type locality, Baños.

References

Moths described in 2008
Euliini
Moths of South America
Taxa named by Józef Razowski